"Renee" is a song by rap group Lost Boyz from their first studio album Legal Drug Money and the Don't Be a Menace to South Central While Drinking Your Juice in the Hood soundtrack. It samples the Janet Jackson song "Funny How Time Flies (When You're Having Fun)".  It was the Lost Boyz' most successful single, reaching number 33 on the Billboard Hot 100 (their only one to reach to top 40) and earning a gold certification from the RIAA for sales of 500,000 copies.

Song information 
The song's lyrics discuss the narrator, a young man, who meets a woman named Renee while coming back from John Jay College of Criminal Justice. The narrator promptly attempts to initiate a relationship. The song describes that Renee is studying to be a lawyer, while the narrator is a writer. The pair date for several weeks, but the relationship ends abruptly when she is shot to death by a burglar at a robbery. The moral of the song is "ghetto love is the law that we live by," describing the inevitable suffering of tragedy by those raised in crime-ridden areas.

Charts

Peak positions

Year-End charts

Certifications

References

1996 songs
1996 singles
Lost Boyz songs
Uptown Records singles
Songs written by Mr. Cheeks